Genting Airport  was a purported airstrip serving Genting in the state of Pahang in Malaysia. However, as of November 2012, IATA (in its Location Identifier Notification #40 bulletin, 2012) claimed back the GTB code because the airport could not be found.
Published co-ordinates are       

    Lat: 2.1166670322 (2°7'0"N)
    Lng: 111.6999969482 (111°41'59"E)   
Elevation     13.00ft  
These coordinates are in woods beside  the river sungai binatang, a tributary to the Rajang near the main road 6308A.

See also
 List of airports in Malaysia

References

External links

Defunct airports in Malaysia
Buildings and structures in Pahang
Transport in Pahang